The Men's Elite Division is a team handball tournament to determine the National Champion from the US. Only qualified teams are allowed to play in this Division. The other teams who fail to qualify play in the Open Division.  Automatic bids are given to the winners of the Northeast Team Handball League, and the Midwest Team Handball and, in the past, were also given to the Great Lakes Team Handball Association, and Western Team Handball League. In the current format, the Elite Division comprises 8 teams. Before the Elite Division existed the National Champion was claimed at the Open Division.

The 2020 and 2021 US Club Nationals were cancelled due to COVID-19 and, hence, no champion was designated.

Results

Individual Awards

Medal count

Men's Elite Medal count

Men's All time Medal count

References

 Men's Elite
|}